German–Polish War may refer to:

German–Polish War (1003–1018)
German–Polish War (1028–1031)

See also
Invasion of Poland (1939), during World War II
List of wars involving Germany
List of wars involving Poland